There are two listings on the National Register of Historic Places in New York by this name:

East Hill Historic District (Ithaca, New York), in Tompkins County
East Hill Historic District (Springville, New York), in Erie County